Aliyak (also Romanized as ‘Alīyak and ‘Alīak) is a village in Soltanabad Rural District, in the Central District of Khoshab County, Razavi Khorasan Province, Iran. At the 2006 census, its population was 761, in 210 families.

See also 

 List of cities, towns and villages in Razavi Khorasan Province

References 

Populated places in Khoshab County